Kurralta Park is a suburb of Adelaide, South Australia in the City of West Torrens.

History
Dr William Wyatt purchased an 80-acre section of land, south-west of Adelaide, which would become Kurralta Park, in 1837. Dr Wyatt (an early Protector of Aborigines) made his home, "Kurralta", in Burnside. "Kurralta" is said to mean "set on a hill" in a local language.

Geography
The area is bound by Anzac Highway to the south, South Road to the east, and Barwell Avenue to the north. Brownhill Creek divides the suburb.
It is about 4 km from the CBD of Adelaide.

References

Suburbs of Adelaide